In statistics, the Standard deviation line (or SD line) marks points on a scatter diagram that are an equal number of standard deviations away from the average in each dimension. The SD line is a useful visual tool since points in a scatter diagram tend to cluster around it, more or less tightly depending on their correlation.

Properties

Relation to regression line 

Typical distance of points to SD line 
This gives an idea of the spread of points around the SD line.

Statistics
Mathematics